Gmina Spytkowice may refer to either of the following rural administrative districts in Lesser Poland Voivodeship, Poland:
Gmina Spytkowice, Nowy Targ County
Gmina Spytkowice, Wadowice County